The Whigham GW-3 is a family of American mid-wing, single-seat, FAI Open Class gliders that was designed and constructed by Gene Whigham, a retired flight test engineer for Convair. It first flew in 1965.

Design and development
The GW-3 was designed by Whigham as a glider that would be easy for a first time builder to complete and fly.  As such the design emphasizes simplicity of construction to reduce building time. The GW-4 was a higher wing loading development.

The GW-3 and 4 both use a  wing, with a NACA 43012A airfoil. The aircraft are all-metal, with the portion of the wing aft of the spar covered in doped aircraft fabric. The flaps and ailerons are sheet metal covered. The wing design is unusual as it uses a single spar and transmits its torsion and drag loads via a thick leading edge skin. This resulted in wings that weigh  each. The prototype GW-3 weighed  empty in total.

Operational history
The prototype GW-3 was involved in an accident on 9 July 1992 when downdrafts were encountered in mountainous terrain. The aircraft was unable to return to the airport and crashed, resulting in serious injury to the pilot. It was removed from the Federal Aviation Administration registry on 13 September 1997 and listed as "destroyed".

Variants
GW-3
Initial version with a  empty weight and  gross weight. One built and it was crashed on 9 July 1992, listed as destroyed and removed from the FAA registry 13 September 1997.
GW-4
One built and as of July 2011 this aircraft is no longer on the FAA registry.
GW-4A
Development of the GW-3. One built in 1977 and, as of July 2011, this aircraft remains on the FAA registry.

Specifications (GW-3)

See also

References

1960s United States sailplanes
Homebuilt aircraft
Aircraft first flown in 1965
Mid-wing aircraft